Dorcadion balchashense is a species of beetle in the family Cerambycidae. It was described by Suvorov in 1911.

Subspecies
 Dorcadion balchashense balchashense Suvorov, 1911
 Dorcadion balchashense betpakdalense Danilevsky, 1996

See also 
Dorcadion

References

balchashense
Beetles described in 1911